Robert Benoît Joseph Alberic Laurier Major (17 February 1915 – 7 August 1997) was a Liberal party member of the House of Commons of Canada. Born in Ottawa, Ontario, he was an administrator by career.

Elected Office
He was elected at the Argenteuil riding in the 1968 general election and served for only one term, the 28th Canadian Parliament, until 1972. Major did not participate in any further federal elections.

His father-in-law was Thomas Vien who also served as a Member of Parliament as a Senator.

He died at Saint-Lambert, Quebec in 1997. He was survived by his wife and two children.

References

External links
 

1915 births
1997 deaths
Liberal Party of Canada MPs
Members of the House of Commons of Canada from Quebec
Politicians from Ottawa